The 2010 Hungaroring GP3 Series round was a GP3 Series motor race held on July 31 and August 1, 2010, at Hungaroring in Mogyoród, Pest, Hungary. It was the sixth round of the 2010 GP3 Season. The race was used to support the 2010 Hungarian Grand Prix.

Nico Müller took the Race 1 victory, ahead of runaway championship leader Esteban Gutiérrez. Alexander Rossi took his second win of the year in Race 2.

Classification

Qualifying

Feature Race

Sprint Race

See also 
 2010 Hungarian Grand Prix
 2010 Hungaroring GP2 Series round

References

Hungary
GP3